Zoran Švonja (born 4 October 1996) is a Serbian footballer who plays as a midfielder for  Mladost Novi Sad. He is the younger brother of footballer Goran Švonja.

Club career
From 2016 to 2018, he played for OFK Bačka.

References

External links
 
 Zoran Švonja stats at utakmica.rs 
 
 

1996 births
Living people
Footballers from Novi Sad
Association football midfielders
Serbian footballers
Serbian expatriate footballers
Serbian expatriate sportspeople in Italy
Expatriate footballers in Italy
Serbian expatriate sportspeople in Bulgaria
Expatriate footballers in Bulgaria
U.S. Salernitana 1919 players
FK ČSK Čelarevo players
FK Donji Srem players
FK Javor Ivanjica players
OFK Bačka players
FC Lokomotiv 1929 Sofia players
Serbian SuperLiga players
Serbian First League players
Serie C players
Second Professional Football League (Bulgaria) players